José César Ferreira (10 April 1916 – deceased) was a Portuguese footballer who played as midfielder.

Career
Born in Vila do Bispo, near Sagres, Ferreira arrived at Benfica
in 1938, making his debut on 22 December of the same year, against Casa Pia. Although Albino, Gaspar Pinto and Francisco Ferreira left him little chance to play in his first season, in the following years he gradually gained importance, playing 16 league games in 1941–42, 13 in 1942–43 and 17 in 1943–44. From 1944, with the breakthrough of Francisco Moreira, his playing time was cut significantly and he left the club in 1946 with six major titles won in 111 appearances in all competitions.

Honours
Benfica
Primeira Divisão: 1941–42, 1942–43, 1944–45
Taça de Portugal: 1939–40, 1942–43, 1943–44

References
General
 

Specific

External links
 

1916 births
Year of death unknown
Portuguese footballers
S.L. Benfica footballers
Primeira Liga players
Association football midfielders